Will Vaughan is an English professional rugby union player currently unattached who most recently played as a loosehead prop for Premiership Rugby club Bath.

Club career
On 25 January 2019 it was announced that Vaughan would be promoted from the Bath academy squad to the senior squad for the 2019–20 Premiership Rugby season.

References

External links

1998 births
Living people
English rugby union players
Bath Rugby players
Rugby union props